Amro Abdulrahman Ali El-Geziry (born 19 November 1986) is an American modern pentathlete. He competed for Egypt at the 2008, 2012 and 2016 Olympics and placed 32nd, 33rd and 25th, respectively. His brothers, Emad and Omar, are also Olympic pentathletes.

In June 2021, he qualified to represent the United States at the 2020 Summer Olympics.

Personal life
El-Geziry is married to the American Olympic modern pentathlete Isabella Isaksen. In June 2017 El-Geziry joined the United States Army. He is currently a sergeant.

References

External links

1986 births
Living people
American male modern pentathletes
American military Olympians
Egyptian emigrants to the United States
Medalists at the 2019 Pan American Games
Modern pentathletes at the 2008 Summer Olympics
Modern pentathletes at the 2012 Summer Olympics
Modern pentathletes at the 2016 Summer Olympics
Modern pentathletes at the 2019 Pan American Games
Modern pentathletes at the 2020 Summer Olympics
Olympic modern pentathletes of Egypt
Pan American Games gold medalists for the United States
Pan American Games medalists in modern pentathlon
Pan American Games silver medalists for the United States
Sportspeople from Cairo
United States Army non-commissioned officers
World Modern Pentathlon Championships medalists
20th-century American people
21st-century American people